Thomas Bullock (b. Cambridge, England) is a British musician and former member of the electroclash group A.R.E. Weapons.

Career
In the late 1980s Bullock joined the group Tonka, alongside DJ Harvey.  In 1991 he moved to San Francisco and joined the Wicked Sound System with Markie, Jeno, and DJ Garth, and produced downtempo music as Mammal.  He also made a psychedelic album under the name Supergroup, with Charles Uzzell Edwards.

In 1996 he moved to New York City and started A.R.E. Weapons, an early electroclash group.  He left the group a few years later to start the Rub N Tug parties, a Balearic rock band with DJ Harvey called Map of Africa, and a punk project called Bobbie Marie.  He also produced house music as Mirror Boys for DJ Garth's Grayhound label in San Francisco, and performed re-edits as Otterman Empire for Whatever We Want Records in NY.

Starting in 2011 Bullock started a mezcal import business in London called Spirit Bear, and started an improvised musical ensemble with the same name.

References

External links
 Thomas Bullock at Discogs

English rock musicians
Living people
Year of birth missing (living people)